State Route 265 is a west–east thoroughfare completely within Utah County in northern Utah that cuts through Orem and Provo. Utah Valley University and Brigham Young University are in close proximity to SR-265. The entirety of the route is named University Parkway.

Route description
SR-265 begins at the intersection of Geneva Road (SR-114) and University Parkway, heads due east on the latter as a four-lane highway. After crossing Interstate 15, the road widens to six lanes. As the highway passes Utah Valley University, it gains dedicated bus lanes in the median for the Utah Valley Express bus rapid transit system. It continues east for a short time until turning briefly southeast and then straightening out again, heading due east through Orem. Shortly after passing an intersection with US-89 (State Street), the route turns southeast, crossing the Provo River and entering the city limits of Provo. Soon after, the route reaches its eastern terminus, US-189.

The portions of SR-265 east of the I-15 interchange are included in the National Highway System.

History
The State Road Commission designated the initial segment of SR-265, from proposed I-15 east to SR-1 (US-89/US-91), in 1959. That same year, a short State Route 267 was created on Bulldog Boulevard in Provo between SR-1 (500 West) and University Avenue (now, but not then, US-189) near Brigham Young University. Two extensions to SR-265 were made in 1964 - one southeast to SR-7 (US-189) near the university, and another west to SR-114. At the same time, SR-267, which was several blocks south of the extended SR-265, was given back to the city.

Major intersections

References

265
 265
Orem, Utah
Provo, Utah
Streets in Utah